Bernard Thomas Edward Clark (12 November 1856 - 26 September 1915) was an English Catholic Bishop and Missionary.

Life 
Bernard Thomas Edward Clark was born in London on 12 November 1856. He joined the Capuchin Province of Paris in 1874 and was ordained in December 1881.

Episcopal Ministry 
On 21 March 1902, Pope Leo XIII appointed him as Apostolic Vicar of Arabia and Titular Bishop of Tingis. On 1 June 1902, he was consecrated by the Archbishop of Lyon, Cardinal Pierre-Héctor Culier; the Co-Consecrators were The Titular Bishop of Marocco o Marruecos, Bishop Louis-Calixte Victor Lacerre, and the Bishop of Port Victoria o Seychelles, Mike Udischel.  

Clark served as the Apostolic Vicar of Arabia from 21 March 1902 to 18 June 1910. On 10 June 1910, Pope Pius X appointed him as the Bishop of Port Victoria o Seychelles.

Death 
Clark died on 26 September 1915 in Port Victoria at the age of 58.

References 

 

|-
 

1856 births
1915 deaths
Roman Catholic bishops of Port Victoria
English Roman Catholic missionaries
Capuchin bishops
Clergy from London
Roman Catholic bishops in the Middle East
Catholic missionaries in Arabia
Deaths in Seychelles
Apostolic Vicariate of Arabia
Catholic Church in the Arabian Peninsula